is a railway station on the Hitahikosan Line in Tōhō, Fukuoka, Japan, operated by Kyushu Railway Company (JR Kyushu).

Lines
Daigyōji Station is served by the Hitahikosan Line.

Adjacent stations

See also
 List of railway stations in Japan

External links

  

Railway stations in Fukuoka Prefecture
Railway stations in Japan opened in 1946